Skutvika or Skutvik is a small village in the municipality of Hamarøy in Nordland county, Norway. To the west and south of Skutvik is the Økssundet, a sound connecting the Sagfjorden and Vestfjorden.

There were 212 inhabitants in Skutvik in 2011. 
Skutvik has a grocery shop, cafeteria with accommodation, electronics business, school and kindergarten among other things.  The main employer is Mainstream Norway with its salmon-processing plant.  The name Skutvik(a) literally means "(the) ship cove".

Transportation

 Norwegian County Road 81 starts in Skutvik and ends at the European route E6 highway in Ulvsvåg (total length of ).
 There are bus connections with Ulvsvåg, Oppeid and Skutvik are offered through Stoklands Bilruter, a division of Saltens Bilruter.
 There are daily departures of a car-ferry from Skutvik that connect to Svolvær and Skrova in Lofoten connecting County Road 81 to the European route E10 highway. There is increased ferry capacity and numbers of departures during the summer season (June–August).
 There is a high-speed passenger express boat running between the towns of Svolvær and Bodø that stops at Skutvik.

The two-hour ferry ride from Skutvik goes through a varied landscape, first between the mountains of Steigen and the Hamarøya peninsula, and then the crossing of the open ocean of the Vestfjorden, that on a clear day provides the view over the entire Lofoten mountain range. To call at the tiny island of Skrova, the ferry goes between islets and rocks.

Tourist attractions

 Artscape Nordland: The sculpture "Stella Maris" by Steinar Christensen is located next to the beach towards Økssundet.

Accommodations
 Skutvik Fiskecamp (Fish Camp) is located next to the ferry port
 Skutvik Gjestegård (Guesthouse)

References

External links

 Skutvik.com
 Hamarøy county
 Torghatten Nord (Time-schedules for ferry and high-speed passenger express)
 Nordland Adventures: Arranged climbing at Hamarøyskaftet
 Ness Camping
 dintur.no: Skutvik Fiskecamp
 Hamsuns Rike: Skutvik Gjestegård

Hamarøy
Villages in Nordland
Populated places of Arctic Norway